Alan Esmond Bollard  (born 5 June 1951) is a New Zealand economist. He currently serves as the as chair of the New Zealand Infrastructure Commission. He previously served as the Executive Director of the Asia Pacific Economic Cooperation (APEC) Secretariat for the period of 2013–2018, and as the Governor of the Reserve Bank of New Zealand for the period of 2002–2012.

Early life 
Bollard was born in Auckland on 5 June 1951. His parents were Constance Mary and Ted Bollard. He attended Owairaka Primary School, Wesley Intermediate School, and Mount Albert Grammar School. He gained a PhD in economics from the University of Auckland in 1977, and was awarded an honorary Doctor of Laws (LLD) by the same university in 2007.

Career
Bollard headed the New Zealand Institute of Economic Research from 1987–1994 and the Commerce Commission from 1994–1998. He subsequently spent four years as secretary to the Treasury, from 1998–2002. He subsequently served as the Governor of the Reserve Bank of New Zealand from 2002–2012, and as the Executive Director of the Asia Pacific Economic Cooperation (APEC) Secretariat for the period of 2013–2018.

In August 2019, the Minister for Infrastructure, Shane Jones announced the appointment of Dr Alan Bollard as chair of the new Infrastructure Commission, Te Waihanga.

He has edited or written three books on the topic of economic reform in New Zealand.

Recognition 
In 1998, Bollard was elected fellow of the Royal Society Te Apārangi. In the 2013 New Year Honours, Bollard was appointed a Companion of the New Zealand Order of Merit for services to the State.

Personal life 
He is married to venture capitalist Jenny Morel. They married in 1977 and have two sons.

References

Writings
 Design and evaluation of projects with variable labour response: case study of agricultural aid on Atiu (1977). PhD thesis. (Full text)

External links
 New Zealand Reserve Bank Governor to lead APEC Secretariat
 Reserve Bank of New Zealand biography

|-

|-

1951 births
Living people
Companions of the New Zealand Order of Merit
Governors of the Reserve Bank of New Zealand
20th-century New Zealand economists
New Zealand public servants
People educated at Mount Albert Grammar School
University of Auckland alumni
Fellows of the Royal Society of New Zealand
21st-century New Zealand economists